Halmstad Hammers HC, until 2017 known as Halmstad HF, is an ice-hockey club in Sweden.  The team currently plays in Group F of Division 1.  The team was founded in 2006 after the Halmstad Hammers HC who at the time played in the HockeyAllsvenskan went bankrupt.

Current roster

Season-by-season record

References

Eliteprospects.com Halmstad Hammers HC page with complete team history

Ice hockey teams in Sweden
Ice hockey clubs established in 2006
2006 establishments in Sweden
Sport in Halmstad
Ice hockey teams in Halland County